Catalebeda elegans is a moth species in the genus Catalebeda found in Angola and Cameroon.

See also 
 List of moths of Angola
 List of moths of Cameroon

References

External links 

 Catalebeda elegans on eol.org

Moths described in 1925
Lasiocampidae
Insects of Cameroon
Insects of Angola
Moths of Africa